The Zimbabwe Defence Forces (ZDF) are composed of the Zimbabwe National Army (ZNA) and the Air Force of Zimbabwe (AFZ). As a landlocked country, Zimbabwe has no navy. The most senior commander of the ZDF is General Philip Valerio Sibanda. At the time of independence after the Rhodesian Bush War, the then Prime Minister Robert Mugabe declared that integrating Zimbabwe's three armed forces would be one of Zimbabwe's top priorities. The existing Rhodesian Army was combined with the two guerrilla armies; the 20,000-strong Zimbabwe African National Liberation Army (ZANLA) forces of Zimbabwe African National Union-PF and the 15,000-strong Zimbabwe People's Revolutionary Army (ZIPRA) forces of PF-Zimbabwe African People's Union. The current manpower stands at an estimated strength of 29,000 in the Army, and an estimated 4,000 in the Air Force. Since the Rhodesian Bush War, the armed forces has been mostly involved with the suppression of non-state armed cells in a number of operations.

Ministry of Defence
In July 1994 the combined Zimbabwe Defence Forces Headquarters was created.

Manpower
In 2007, the Zimbabwe National Army had an estimated strength of 29,000 and the Air Force of Zimbabwe had an estimated 4,000 men assigned.

History 

At the time of independence, the then Prime Minister Robert Mugabe declared that integrating Zimbabwe's three armed forces would be one of Zimbabwe's top priorities. The existing Rhodesian Army was combined with the two guerrilla armies; the 20,000-strong Zimbabwe African National Liberation Army (ZANLA) forces of Zimbabwe African National Union-PF and the 15,000-strong Zimbabwe People's Revolutionary Army (ZIPRA) forces of PF-Zimbabwe African People's Union. A British Military Assistance and Training Team played a pivotal role in assisting the creation of the new army, and was still in place in 2000. The Rhodesian Air Force was eventually reorganised as the Air Force of Zimbabwe.

Mozambique Civil War 

The Mozambique Civil War occurred between the FRELIMO Government and RENAMO. The rebel group was funded by Rhodesian intelligence in the 1970s and later the apartheid South African government to destabilize Mozambique and Zimbabwe. The Zimbabwe Defence Forces got involved to protect Zimbabwe's eastern city of Mutare and the strategic railway line to Mozambique's port city of Beira which were being attacked by RENAMO. This was also seen as assistance to the FRELIMO government which had assisted Zimbabwe rebel fighters based in Mozambique during Rhodesian Bush War. Some RENAMO elements had crossed from Mozambique into Zimbabwe several times, robbing shops along the border and had burned down a timber factory. After several meetings with Mozambican officials it was agreed that the ZDF could conduct "hot pursuits" into Mozambique of any RENAMO elements that may have raided Zimbabwe. On this pretext the ZDF begun planning follow-up operations which would take them deep into Mozambique culminating in occupation of former RENAMO bases at Gorongosa. The decision to send Zimbabwean troops to fight RENAMO was partly influenced by Zimbabwe's close relationship with the Mozambican government which dates back to FRELIMO's assistance for ZANU in its fight against Rhodesia. There was also the underlying fact that FRELIMO and ZANU shared a common Marxist ideology of scientific socialism. The South Africa-backed RENAMO professed to be an anti-communist movement, as did Jonas Savimbi's UNITA movement, which was fighting against the Marxist MPLA government of Angola. There was thus an ideological alliance of the Maputo - Harare - Luanda axis, with support for these governments from the Soviet Union.

Operation Lemon 
The first of the ZDF follow-up operations was launched from Katiyo and Aberdeen in northern Manicaland, code-named Operation "Lemon". The five-day operation lasted from the 5th to 9 December 1984. It comprised elements of 3 Brigade, the Parachute Group, Special Air Service (SAS), and was supported by the Air Force of Zimbabwe (AFZ). Poor weather conditions and the difficult mountainous terrain reduced the use of aircraft, and most transportation had to be done by helicopters. The movement of troops on the ground was also difficult. Four contacts were made and two RENAMO bases were destroyed. While successful in capturing the bases themselves, most RENAMO elements in the bases managed to escape and only eight were captured. The ZDF considered this operation as a major failure and the code word Lemon was corrupted to mean any failure in all subsequent operations. It was further established that there were no other permanent bases in the area, only some advance posts and temporary bases used by RENAMO as launching pads for food raids into Zimbabwe. The raid was important in establishing the location of the main RENAMO base at Messinse, Chito, Nyazonia, Buetoni, Gorongosa Central Base and Casa Banana.

Casa Banana Raid
Intelligence sources had indicated that Cassa Banana, RENAMO's national headquarters had a strength of 400 elements. However, the organisation maintained a string of other smaller bases along the Gorongosa Mountains, which were considered as part of the main base. This raised the total estimated strength in the area to 1 000 elements. During the night of 27 August 1985, three Zimbabwe infantry battalions were established in their Form Up Points (FUP) with the help of the SAS and Commando elements. At Chimoio a Fireforce was being given final briefing, and five AFZ planes were given orders for a first light take-off for Gorongosa on the morning of 28 August. The Fireforce was divided into three sections each with one helicopter gunship, two transport helicopters and two transport aircraft with paratroopers. Each Fireforce section was detailed to attack specific suspected RENAMO positions around the Gorongossa Mountains. It was during this three pronged attack that one helicopter observed activity on the ground at the location that had been given at the briefing as Cassa Banana. Fighter jets from Thornhill, which were already in the air, began the raid on Cassa Banana. It took the entire day to conclude the raid. No official records of casualties for either contingent were given.

Operation Restore Legacy

In October 2017, the ZDF was involved in a coup d'état which resulted in the resignation of long-serving President Robert Mugabe and the formation of a new government under Emmerson Mnangagwa.

Notes

References
 
 
 Reuters Report
 Central Intelligence Organisation
 https://www.enca.com/africa/full-statement-by-zim-army-on-state-broadcaster
 Operation Restore Legacy

Further reading
Abiodun Alao, 'The Metamorphosis of the Unorthodox: The Integration and Development of the Zimbabwe National Army' (chapter in book compiled by Terence Ranger, 'Soldiers in Zimbabwe's Liberation War'), 1995
Norma J. Kriger, ‘Guerrilla Veterans in Post-war Zimbabwe: Symbolic and Violent Politics,’ 1980–1987, Cambridge UP, 2003

External links
Zimbabwe Ministry of Defence